I Can't Put My Finger on It is the second and last album by Miniature, drummer Joey Baron, saxophonist Tim Berne and cellist Hank Roberts, which was recorded in 1991 and released on the JMT label.

Reception
The AllMusic review by Stephen Cook stated: "The result here is a corralled mix of bop, free jazz, soundtrack ambience, and funk, all wrapped in Berne's cerebrally swinging sound. And while not a substitute for one of Berne's or Baron's solo outings of the '90s, I Can't Put My Finger on It will still please fans of the New York downtown jazz sound." The Penguin Guide to Jazz Recordings praised the album, writing that it has the edge over the debut.

Track listing
All compositions by Tim Berne except as indicated
 "Zilla" - 2:34   
 "Jersey Devil" (Hank Roberts) - 5:32   
 "P.G. Suggested" (Joey Baron) - 6:30   
 "Combat" - 13:30   
 "Aspetta" (Baron) - 7:16   
 "Lowball" - 3:45   
 "Luna" - 9:17   
 "Bullfrog Breath" (Roberts) - 10:19   
 "Who's Vacant?" (Baron) - 5:27   
 "Weasels in the Bush" (Roberts) - 9:32   
 "Dink" (Baron) - 1:19

Personnel
Tim Berne - alto saxophone, baritone saxophone
Hank Roberts - cello, jazz-a-phone fiddle, voice
Joey Baron - drums, membranophone, shakatronics

References 

1991 albums
Tim Berne albums
Hank Roberts albums
Joey Baron albums
JMT Records albums
Winter & Winter Records albums